Empress is the fifth studio album by Yemi Alade. It was released through her label Effyzzie Music Group on 20 November 2020. It features guest appearances from French singers Dadju and Vegedream; her colleagues from Nigeria, Patoranking and Rudeboy; British Grammy-winning singer Estelle; and Mzansi Youth Choir from South Africa. It is an afrobeat record with 15 tracks that incorporates elements of gospel music, couple decale, soul, pop, dancehall and highlife; all afr o.

Alade released "Boyz" and "True Love" as leading singles from the album. Three singles  charted on Billboard Top Triller Global, making Alade the only Nigerian woman to have such entries with a single album.

Background and promotion 
Empress includes a diverse range of afropop. On its cover is art that showcases Alade as an African royal. This is an afrobeats record that is built mostly in elements of highlife and dancehall. The melodies of Empress are suited to a live experience.

Alade revealed in an interview that when she released her previous album Woman of Steel, she was already recording Empress. She spent two years recording the album. She said that most of its tracks were produced in Amsterdam with the help of her European sound engineers alongside her crew. The album features guest appearances from French singers Vegedream and Dadju, and  Nigerian artistes Patoranking and Rudeboy. It also features the British Grammy Award-winning singer Estelle and the Mzansi Youth Choir.

Composition 
The first album track is "True Love" which incorporates elements of amapiano South African house music; Alade sings "DJ play that happy music, .... leave the negativity for back" as a mode of setting aside sadness for happiness through music. The second track is "Yoyoyo" built in highlife from southeastern Nigeria; Alade fantasizes about a typical Nigerian play boy and college scarlet girl. Mami water is a Nigerian concept of a mermaid. It is used to describe light-skinned beautiful women or women possessed by the spirit of Poseidon. The Vegedream assisted track is "Lose My Mind". Alade collaborated with a French singer and rapper to produce a song with an African expression of love. "Dancina", the fifth track, is a dance song with a European/Ghanaian originated beat. "Boyz" is a dancehall track in which Alade describes the qualities of the type of men she desires. "I Choose You" featuring Dadju is a pop song. Alade again uses dancehall and afrofusion elements in "Control", the eight track. "Temptation" features Patoranking, Alade's counterpart and co-coach on The Voice Nigeria. "Ice" is a dive from afrobeats, in which Alade displays her vocal dexterity. Rudeboy was featured on the eleventh track "Deceive", in which Alade tells of a story of deception in love. "Turn Up" is another highlife track; Alade sings about loving an ideal celebrity-like man. "Rain", the thirteenth track, features the Mzansi Youth Choir from South Africa; an African gospel music Alade sings about unison. "Weekend" features the British Grammy-winning singer Estelle; Alade takes a break from her regular Pan-African sounds in this track. The last track is "Double Double". Alade uses electronic highlife to express joy for her achievements.

Critical reception 

Empress garnered 10 million streams on YouTube and YouTube music within days of its release. Within four weeks, it had twenty million streams on all streaming platforms.

Motolani Alake of Pulse said the album "explores different aspects of love and emotion – be it in from the perspective of kinship as heard on Rain or romance as heard on the others [sic] songs on the album." He gave the album a score of 5.9/10.

Oyin Aregbesola of Sounds of Africa said the album is "an amalgamation of what Yemi is known for plus a mash of Afro-pop, Gospel House, Highlife, Soul, Coupe decale, Gospel, and even Dancehall; she created a body of work that has something for everyone but still manages to be authentic."

Olayiide Bolaji of The Scoove Africa gave the album an 8/10, saying that Empress "is Yemi Alade's best album yet... she incorporates Afrobeats into all parts of the world while featuring timeless music..."

Notjustok describes the album as "a feast of sounds", saying, "Its diverse yet cohesive nature serves as an aural depiction of the cultural richness of Africa with something to suit everyone's palates."

Accolades

Track listing 
Credits adapted from Genius, album cover art and other publications.

Personnel 
Credits adapted from Alade's album cover.

 Yemi Alade – primary artiste, composer and executive producer
 Taiye Aliyu – executive producer
 Vtek – producer (track 1,6,11,13,15) and extra vocals (track 15)
 Krizbeatz – producer (track 2,12)
 Jimmy Huru – producer (track 3, 8, 11)
Egar Boi – producer
Yung Felix – producer
 Fiokee – guitar (track 2, 12)
Max Meurs – guitar 
Vegedream – featured artiste
Estelle – featured artiste
Dadju – featured artiste

Charts 
Singles from the album charted in Top Triller Global (Billboard).

Release history

References 

2020 albums
Afrobeats albums
Yemi Alade albums